Member of Parliament (MP) is a term typically used to describe an elected politician in the House of Commons of Canada, the lower chamber of the bicameral Parliament of Canada.

Terminology 
The term's primary usage is in reference to the elected members of the House of Commons. In legislation it can also refer to the unelected members of the Senate. In common use, however, the title senator is typically used, whereas no such alternate title exists for members of the House of Commons. A less ambiguous term for members of both chambers is parliamentarian.

There are 338 elected MPs, who each represent an individual electoral district, known as a riding. MPs are elected using the first-past-the-post system in a general election or byelection, usually held every four years or less. The 105 members of the Senate are appointed by the Crown on the advice of the prime minister.

Representation 
As of 2021, the Canadian House of Commons has 338 members, each of whom represents a single riding. Seats are distributed among the provinces in proportion to population, as determined by each decennial census, subject to the following exceptions made by the Constitution of Canada. Firstly, the "Senate floor" guarantees that each province will have at least as many elected MPs as senators. Secondly, the "grandfather clause" guarantees each province has at least as many seats now as it had allocated in the 1985 Representation Act.

Oath and affirmation 
The oath for members of Parliament has stood the same since confederation; according to Section IX.128 of the Constitution Act, 1867: "Every member of the Senate and the House of Commons of Canada shall before taking his Seat therein take and subscribe before the Governor General or some Person authorized by him, and every Member of a Legislative Council or Legislative Assembly of any Province shall before the Lieutenant Governor of the Province or some Person authorized by him, the Oath of Allegiance contained in the Fifth Schedule to the Act." The oath set out in said schedule is: I, [name], do swear, that I will be faithful and bear true Allegiance to Her Majesty Queen Victoria, with the further instruction that "the name of the King or Queen of the United Kingdom of Great Britain and Ireland for the Time being is to be substituted from Time to Time, with Proper Terms of Reference thereto." The oath reads as follows:Or in French:

For those parliamentarians whose religion prohibits the swearing of oaths, there exists a compromise affirmation, first instituted in 1905:

Number of members 
181 MPs were elected at the 1867 Canadian federal election.

308 MPs were elected at the 2011 Canadian federal election.

338 MPs were elected at the 2021 Canadian federal election.

Privileges 
Parliamentarians enjoy parliamentary privilege, as derived from common law.

Remuneration 
In 2021, the annual salary of each MP is $189,500. Members may receive additional sums by virtue of other positions or functions they hold, such as that of Speaker of the House or a minister of the Crown.

See also 
 Member of parliament

References

External links 

 List of current House of Commons members 

Members of the House of Commons of Canada
1867 establishments in Canada
Westminster system
Members of Parliament